Andrea Dromm (born February 18, 1941) is a former American actress. She is the daughter of an engineer, and attended school in Patchogue and later in Greensburg, Pennsylvania.

Career
Dromm's career began as a child model at the age of six, but she felt it interfered with her school work. She attended the University of Connecticut, where she studied drama, acting in student productions of The Diary of Anne Frank, The Crucible, and Romeo and Juliet. She dropped out and hitchhiked to San Francisco, but eventually returned for her degree, after which she began work as a New York model, signing with the Eileen Ford Agency. Her career rose dramatically after her appearance in a National Airlines television commercial in 1963 as the stewardess asking "Is this any way to run an airline? You bet it is!"

On the strength of the ad's popularity, she was urged to seek a Hollywood career. Her first job was in an episode of Star Trek playing Yeoman Smith in "Where No Man Has Gone Before" (1965), the series' second pilot.

Dromm then moved on to do The Russians Are Coming, the Russians Are Coming (1966), in which she played a teenaged babysitter who falls in love with a handsome Soviet sailor. She then co-starred in Come Spy with Me (1967), a spy spoof that fell flat. She also appeared as hostess of a TV special on surfing. After this experience, she returned to New York modeling, and for a time was the Clairol "Summer Blonde" girl who appeared in television and print ads.

In 1988, People reported that she was living off real estate investments and splitting her time between homes in The Hamptons, Long Island and Palm Beach, Florida.

Filmography 
 Star Trek: The Original Series
 episode "Where No Man Has Gone Before" as Yeoman Smith
 The Russians Are Coming, the Russians Are Coming (1966) as Alison Palmer
 Come Spy with Me (1967) as Jill Parsons

References

External links 
 
 

1941 births
Living people
20th-century American actresses
American child models
American film actresses
American television actresses
Female models from New York (state)
People from Long Island
University of Connecticut alumni
21st-century American women